Shkot Island (Russian: Остров Шкота lit. Isle of Shkot) is an island in the Eugénie Archipelago within the Peter the Great Gulf of the Sea of Japan. Shkot Island is located  directly south of Russky Island, to which it is connected by a low thin isthmus, making it one of only two islands in the archipelago accessible to the mainland by foot. 

Shkot Island, like all islands of Eugénie Archipelago, is administratively part of the city of Vladivostok in Primorsky Krai, Russia. The island was named after Nikolay Shkot, the commander of the Russian Imperial Navy corvette Amerika who led one of the earliest hydrographic expeditions in the Primorsky Krai and Sakhalin regions of the Russian Far East in 1863, and was a co-founder of Vladivostok.

References 

Islands of the Russian Far East
Islands of the Sea of Japan
Uninhabited islands of Russia
Islands of Vladivostok